Hasta el fin del mundo (previously known as Sangre de guerreras), is a Mexican telenovela premiered on Canal de las Estrellas on July 28, 2014, and concluded on April 19, 2015. The series is produced for Televisa by Nicandro Díaz González and adapted by Kary Fajer, based on the Argentine telenovela produced by Telefe, entitled Dulce amor.

It stars Pedro Fernández, later replaced by David Zepeda, Marjorie De Sousa, María Rojo later replaced by Leticia Perdigón, César Évora, Claudia Álvarez, Diego Olivera as the titular characters, along with Mariana Seoane and Julián Gil as the main villains.

Synopsis
Sofía Ripoll (Marjorie De Sousa), a beautiful, intelligent and strong character, is the general manager of the Ripoll Factory, the girlfriend of Patricio Iturbide (Julián Gil) and the older sister of Alexa (Claudia Álvarez) and Daniela (Jade Fraser). When her father passes away, Sofia is in charge of the family business because her mother, Greta Bandy (Olivia Bucio), a widow of Ripoll, decides to dedicate her life to the plastic arts by evading her responsibilities.

Salvador Cruz (Pedro Fernández/David Zepeda) is a simple man, noble and nice; racing driver and mechanic, but because of a sabotage, he loses an important career that ends his dreams, being forced to accept a job as a driver of Sofía. Both feel an immediate attraction, starting a story where they must overcome a series of obstacles, among them Patricio, an ambitious man that under the orders of Gerónimo Peralta (Roberto Vander), uses Sofía to take possession of the premises where the Ripoll chocolate factory is located. Sofía has another enemy nearby, Silvana Blanco (Mariana Seoane), her supposed best friend, a woman resentful of a past event that marked her against The Ripoll family, is Patricio's lover and both will form an alliance to destroy the lives of Sofía and Salvador.

Alexa (Claudia Álvarez) is an extroverted girl, capricious and spoiled by her mother. She returns from Spain because her economic situation is complicated, but she has made her family believe that she has a successful career in the world of cinema. Arriving in the city, Armando Romero (Diego Olivera, friend and compadre of Salvador, is the one who comes to meet her, causing a great attraction in Alexa, who will suffer aggression by the jealousy of Irma (Aleida Núñez), Armando's sentimental partner.

Daniela is the smallest of the sisters, a cute girl who gives light to her home. In a shopping center she meets Lucas Cavazos (Miguel Martínez) who will fill with love the life of the young woman, who is spontaneous and friendly, but has a difficult history due to the abandonment of Rosa, his mother and has been in the care of his grandmother Miguelina (María Prado), who works as cook at the Ripoll mansion. Lucas accepts illicit work in order to get his grandmother on.

The Ripoll sisters, will have an accomplice and counselor, Fausto Rangel (Alejandro Tommasi), butler in the mansion, to whom he dedicates his life in body and soul living next to them the most unusual situations. A secret that Greta holds, could change the life of the Ripoll sisters, especially of Sofia, who despite being a strong woman, will suffer the betrayal and pain of disappointment; nevertheless, his heart will not be able to resist the sweet taste of a new illusion next to Salvador. Sofía, Alexa, and Daniela will seek the path to happiness, each struggling for love, starting a journey that can take them to the end of the world.

Cast

Main 
 Pedro Fernández as Salvador Cruz Sánchez / Chava
 Marjorie De Sousa as Sofía Ripoll Bandy
 María Rojo as Guadalupe "Lupita" Sánchez
 César Évora as Francisco "Paco" Fernández
 Claudia Álvarez as Alexa Ripoll Bandy
 Diego Olivera as Armando Romero
 Mariana Seoane as Silvana Blanco 
 Julián Gil as Patricio Iturbide
 David Zepeda as Salvador Cruz Sánchez / Chava
 Leticia Perdigón as Guadalupe "Lupita" Sánchez

Secondary 
 Roberto Vander as Gerónimo Peralta de la Riva
 Olivia Bucio as Greta Bandy de Ripoll
 Alejandro Tommasi as Fausto Rangel
 Aleida Núñez as Irma Fernández Martínez
 Julio Camejo as Matías Escudero
 Carlos Gascón as Alan Duncan
 María Prado as Miguelina Ávila
 Jorge Ortín as Refugio / Cuco
 Jade Fraser as Daniela Ripoll Bandy
 Miguel Martínez as Lucas Cavazos Valera
 Mariana Van Rankin as Marisol Cruz Sánchez
 Alan Slim as Cristian Blanco / Iker Gálvez
 Nicolás Chunga as Fernando "Nandito" Romero Fernández
 Roberto Palazuelos as Mauro Renzi
 Roberto Ballesteros as Comandante Félix Tavares
 Ricardo Barona as Antonio Manjarrez
 Ivonne Ley as Ceci
 Rafael del Villar as Langarica
 Carlos Cámara Jr. as Octavio Ripoll
 Ximena Herrera as Araceli Fernández
 Sugchey Abrego as Iraís
 Tony Bravo as Javier
 Eddy Vilard as Oliver Peralta 
 Emireth Rivera as Morgana
 Rebeca Mankita as Isadora
 Vanessa Arias as Flor

Recurring 
 Javier Jattin as Paolo Elizondo
 Arleth Terán as Regina Duarte
 Ricardo Margaleff as Pedro
 Lilia Aragón as Yuba
 Alberto Estrella as Don
 Pedro Moreno as Ranku
 Kuno Becker as Salvador's friend
 Roger Cudney as Mike Stone (Mister Sam)

Mexico broadcast 
On July 28, 2014, Canal de las Estrellas broadcast Hasta el fin del mundo weeknights at 9:25pm, replacing Lo que la vida me robó. The last episode was broadcast on April 19, 2015, with Lo imperdonable replacing it the following day.

United States broadcast 
On August 18, 2014, Univision broadcast Hasta el fin del mundo weeknights at 9pm/8c, replacing Lo Que La Vida Me Robó. The last episode was broadcast on May 15, 2015, with Lo imperdonable replacing it on May 18, 2015.

Soundtrack

Awards and nominations

Notes

References

External links 
 

2014 telenovelas
Mexican telenovelas
Televisa telenovelas
2014 Mexican television series debuts
Television shows set in Mexico City
Television shows set in Miami
Television shows set in Panama
2015 Mexican television series endings
Mexican television series based on Argentine television series
Spanish-language telenovelas